Sweet Shop is a limited edition compilation of rare and unreleased recordings by London-based glam rockers Rachel Stamp. It was released in 2004 via Rachel Stamp's official website and sold at gigs around the UK. The album features the unreleased WEA album, Fight the Force of Evil as well as an assortment of B-sides and unreleased demo tracks by the WEA era line up of the band. The album is currently out of print.

The Album 
Released May 3, 2004
(RS SS 001)

Track listing
 Hey Hey Michael You're Really Fantastic (long version)
 Madonna... Cher...
 Stealing Clothes From Shelley Barrett
 Dead Girl
 Je Suis Maisee
 I Like Girlz
 Pop Singer
 True Love
 Queen Bee (alternate mix)
 Heroine
 Don't Get Married (previously unreleased)
 Didn't I Break My Heart Over You
 Metallic Peach (demo)
 Baby Baby (demo)
 My Sweet Rose (demo)
 Sluts And Sharks (DRP Vocal)
 Science Fiction
 n.a.u.s.e.a.

Facts 
 "Sweet Shop" was only available through the band's official website and at gigs around the UK
 The album contains Rachel Stamp's unreleased WEA album, "Fight the Force of Evil". The album also features extended versions of "Hey Hey Michael You're Really Fantastic" (which continues after the fade out on the original single release), a 9-minute recording of "Didn't I Break My Heart Over You" by the original line up of the band as well as the previously unreleased track, "Don't Get Married".
 The album also features the alternate mix of "Queen Bee" which could only be found on early pressings of the "I Got the Worm" single.
 The demo of "Baby Baby" was originally on the first Rachel Stamp demo tape from 1995. 
 The demo of "My Sweet Rose" was the last recording made by the WEA line up of the band. 
 The demo of "Metallic Peach" was recorded for possible inclusion on the album, but was left on the cutting room floor. 
 "Sweet Shop" also features 3 rare B-sides from the WEA period - "Sluts And Sharks" (with the original DRP vocal track, available for the first time) and "Science Fiction" and "n.a.u.s.e.a." from the "Hey Hey Michael You're Really Fantastic" single.

References

Rachel Stamp albums
2004 compilation albums